Martin Schmidt may refer to:
 Martin Schmidt (football manager) (born 1967), Swiss football manager
 Martin Schmidt (footballer) (born 1983), German footballer
 Martin Schmidt (judoka) (born 1969), German judoka
 Martin Schmidt (musician) (born 1964), member of the electronic music duo Matmos
 Martin Schmidt (handballer) (born 1969), German handball player
 Martin A. Schmidt (born 1960), American electrical engineer and university administrator
 Martin Benno Schmidt (1863–1949), German pathologist
 Martin Johann Schmidt (1718–1801), Austrian painter
 Marty Schmidt (Martin Walter Schmidt, 1960–2013), New Zealand-American mountain climber, guide and adventurer
 DJ Dean (born 1978), German DJ and producer whose real name is Martin Schmidt

See also 
 Firmin Martin Schmidt (1918–2005), Roman Catholic bishop